The Imperial University of Constantinople, sometimes known as the University of the Palace Hall of Magnaura, was an Eastern Roman educational institution that could trace its corporate origins to 425 AD, when the emperor Theodosius II founded the Pandidacterium.

The Pandidakterion was refounded in 1046 by Constantine IX Monomachos who created the Departments of Law (Διδασκαλεῖον τῶν Νόμων) and Philosophy (Γυμνάσιον).

At the time various economic schools, colleges, polytechnics, libraries and fine arts academies also operated in the city of Constantinople.

History 

Byzantine society on the whole was an educated one. Primary education was widely available, sometimes even at village level and uniquely in that era for both sexes. Female participation in culture was high. Scholarship was fostered not only in Constantinople but also in institutions operated in such major cities as Antioch and Alexandria.

The original school was founded in 425 by Emperor Theodosius II with 31 chairs for law, philosophy, medicine, arithmetic, geometry, astronomy, music, rhetoric and other subjects, 15 to Latin and 16 to Greek. The university existed until the 15th century.

The main content of higher education for most students was rhetoric, philosophy and law with the aim of producing competent, learned personnel to staff the bureaucratic postings of state and church. In this sense the university was the secular equivalent of the Theological Schools. The university maintained an active philosophical tradition of Platonism and Aristotelianism, with the former being the longest unbroken Platonic school, running for close to two millennia until the 15th century.

The School of Magnaura was founded in the 9th century but did not last very long, and in the 11th new schools of philosophy and law were established at the Capitol School. The period of decline began with the Latin conquest of 1204 although the university survived as a non-secular institution under Church management until the Fall of Constantinople in 1453, and was refounded as the Phanar Greek Orthodox College. The primary University of the city became a madrasa (now Istanbul University), established by Mehmet II following the conquest of the city. Both of these institutions are still operational today.

Matthaios Kamariotis, lecturer of the university, became the first director of Phanar Greek Orthodox College, which was established in 1454.

Status 
A few scholars have gone so far as to call the Pandidakterion the first "university" in the world, but this view does not take into account that the Byzantine centers of higher learning generally lacked the corporative structure of the medieval universities of Western Europe which were the first to use the Latin term universitas for the corporations of students and masters that came to define the institutional character of the university thereafter.
Nonetheless, the Dictionnaire encyclopédique du Moyen Âge tentatively identifies the Pandidakterion of 425 AD as a "university institution".

See also 
 Byzantine Aristotelianism
 Byzantine university
 Faculty and alumni of the University of Constantinople

References

External links
 Spyros Panagopoulos, "Higher Education in Byzantium" 

Greek culture
Constantinople
425 establishments
Constantinople
1453 disestablishments in Europe
Constantinople, University of
Education in the Byzantine Empire
5th-century establishments in the Byzantine Empire
Theodosius II